Arnaud Merlin (born 1963) is a French jazz critic, music journalist and radio producer who works mainly for France Musique in recent years.

Career 
Arnaud Merlin studied music at the Paris-Sorbonne University and Conservatoire de Paris, where he was awarded the History of Music and Aesthetics Prizes. He works as a music journalist since 1985, mainly for magazines like Jazz Hot, Jazzman and Le Monde de la musique.

From 1992 to 2004, he was member of the Académie Charles-Cros and Académie du Jazz, editorial secretary of Cité Musiques (the newspaper of Cité de la Musique), . Since 1996 he started to produce music programmes on jazz and contemporary music for France Musique and Radio France. He was a member of the Artistic Committee of the Anglo-French Fund for Contemporary Music “Diaphonique” and the Commission Jazz & Blues.

With Franck Bergerot, he co-authored a two-volume miniseries about jazz music entitled  (lit. “The Epic of Jazz”), which are two heavily illustrated pocket books published in the collection “Découvertes Gallimard”, in 1991. The second volume  has been translated into English, Italian, Russian and Korean.

Publications 
 With Franck Bergerot, Du blues au bop : L’épopée du jazz – Volume I, collection « Découvertes Gallimard » (nº 114), série Arts. Éditions Gallimard, 1991
 With Franck Bergerot, L’épopée du jazz 2/ Au-delà du bop, collection « Découvertes Gallimard » (nº 115), série Arts. Éditions Gallimard, 1991
 The Story of Jazz: Bop and Beyond, ‘New Horizons’ series, Thames & Hudson, 1993 (UK edition)
 The Story of Jazz: Bop and Beyond, “Abrams Discoveries” series. Harry N. Abrams, 1993 (U.S. edition)

References 

1963 births
Jazz writers
French music critics
French music journalists
French radio presenters
Conservatoire de Paris alumni
Paris-Sorbonne University alumni
Living people